Retroaktiv is a 2000 Sven-Ingvars studio album.

Track listing
Högt i det blå / P. Gessle
På toppen igen / P. LeMarc
Saker jag borde gjort / N. Strömstedt, P. Gessle
Nånting stort hos mej / N. Hellberg
Kyssarna! / U. Svenningsson
När jag tänker på dej / P. LeMarc
Rödtopp / N. Strömstedt
Här nere på jorden / P. LeMarc
Lite som du vill / N. Hellberg
En mogen mans blues / L. Ahlin, S. Westfelt
Sofia i spegeln / P. LeMarc
Att just nu här i dag / L. Nilsson, H. Janson
Blåa ögon / P. Jonsson
Så många mil, så många år / D. Hylander

Charts

References 

2000 albums
Sven-Ingvars albums